is a Japanese manga series written and illustrated by Inio Asano. It was serialized in Shogakukan's Weekly Young Sunday between 2007 and 2008. Later in Weekly Big Comic Spirits from 2008 to 2013, its chapters were collected in thirteen tankōbon volumes. In North America, it was licensed for English release by Viz Media.

A coming-of-age drama story, it follows the life of a child named Onodera Punpun, from his elementary school years to his early 20s, as he copes with his dysfunctional family, love life, friends, life goals and hyperactive mind, while occasionally focusing on the lives and struggles of his schoolmates and family. Punpun and the members of his family are normal humans, but are depicted to the reader in the form of crudely drawn birds. The manga explores themes such as depression, love, social isolation, sex, death, and family.

Summary 
Goodnight Punpun follows the life experiences of Punpun Onodera, a young boy living in Japan, as well as a few of his friends. The story follows Punpun as he grows up, splitting it into around 4 stages of his life: Elementary school, middle school, high school, and his early 20s.

Characters 
 / 
A young boy who is most often depicted as a bird, although he is also shown in other forms as his character evolves. When he is feeling confused about life or depressed he consults "God" using a chant his uncle taught him.

Punpun's primary love interest. Early on, she suggests that she and Punpun run away to Kagoshima. She occasionally takes on the last name .

A being, displayed as a photographic afro head, that often appears in front of Punpun in his times of need (Punpun "summons" him by saying, "Dear God, Dear God, Tinkle hoy").
Mama Punpun
Punpun's mother, depressed and suffering from mood swings and anger issues. She has a very conflicted relationship with Punpun, to whom she gives her last name, Onodera, after she and Punpun's father get divorced.

Punpun's uncle, a 30-something freeter. Yūichi takes care of Punpun while his mother is in the hospital.

Yūichi's girlfriend who runs a cafe. She briefly joins Punpun's family during middle school and helps take care of him and his family.

A young woman Punpun meets in his young adult life. She is an aspiring manga artist who grows to be one of Punpun's close friends.

One of Punpun's childhood friends, who is a close companion of Shimizu. He is cynical and aloof, but cares deeply for Shimizu.

One of Punpun's childhood friends. Shimizu has a wild imagination and depends on Seki. He later joins Pegasus' cult.

The leader of a cult in Punpun's city and a recurring side character.

Aiko's mother. A cult member, she is cruel and abusive to her daughter, and shows signs of mental instability. Though she ends up crippled, later chapters suggest this may be an act.

Punpun's landlord, who becomes his friend.

One of Punpun's childhood friends. He becomes an elementary school teacher.

Production 
Asano announced the manga a year after finishing Solanin. Encouraged by its success, Asano said he was done with "feel-good stories". Despite initial opposition from his editor and publisher, he went through with the manga. Tokie Komuro, the editor-in-chief of Monthly Sunday Gene-X, who is a supporter of Asano said that the only reason Asano was able to serialize the manga was because of his good track record and reputation from his earlier works.

When he initially planned the story, Asano wanted to chronicle Punpun's growth spanning ten years over seven volumes. The first half was supposed to be a romance, and the second half when Punpun and Aiko go on the run similar to a road movie. The manga grew to thirteen volumes because Asano wanted to focus on the art and because many characters developed their own side stories. Asano purposely emphasized elements of the first half like its silliness to increase the shock of the second half. With every dark turn in the manga, sales dropped, which Asano regretted because his readers were being alienated. He also saw his readers as an enemy when he received criticism, which led him to react harshly and cause more backlash. The manga also served as an outlet for Asano's doubts and fears, such as the fear that he might be a victim or perpetrator of murder.

When designing Punpun, Asano wanted to find a balance between making his male protagonist too handsome or too ugly and decided to let readers imagine his face. Asano originally planned to depict all the characters like Punpun's family, but his editor did not like the idea. Asano utilized photography and computer graphics for the backgrounds of the manga. Outdoor backgrounds were created by taking photographs, converting them to black-and-white, and printing them so his assistants could draw outlines and objects on them. Interiors were created in 3D modeling software, which had the benefit of capturing angles impossible with cameras. When asked why he placed so much emphasis on the backgrounds, Asano said that it allows the drawings to have more impact, especially since characters like Punpun are lacking in dynamism. Asano later came to regret digitally processing his images because he felt he was ruining his pen art.

Themes 
Punpun's depiction as a faceless caricature was meant to help readers identify with Punpun and encourage them to keep reading, both when he was depicted as a bird, and in his later forms. Asano also utilized Punpun's simple look for symbolism, like giving him bull horns to represent Altair, the cowherd star, to symbolize his love triangle as the Summer Triangle with Aiko as Vega and Sachi as Deneb.

Asano described the young Punpun as a fundamentalist, which leads to his regrets and dislike of gray areas later. Asano also ascribed these characteristics to the other characters: "The main characters in Punpun always remain children in the way their purity leads them to fail and become social misfits." At end of the manga, Asano was originally going to make Punpun die while saving a child of a friend, but he felt that it was too "clean" of an ending. He continued the theme of nothing going right for Punpun by making him live and by denying Punpun solitude after Aiko's death by pairing him up with Sachi. In the final chapter, Punpun's experiences are contrasted with those of his childhood friend Harumi to show Punpun from the perspective of a normal person. Harumi sees Punpun surrounded by friends, but in reality nothing went right for him, further emphasizing the theme of failure.

In terms of genres, Asano disliked the labeling of the manga as an utsumanga (depressing manga) or surreal, which he felt pigeonholed the manga. Since the manga was serialized in a seinen magazine, Asano created the manga for readers who could accept immorality rather than see the protagonist as a role model.

Release 
Written and illustrated by Inio Asano, Goodnight Punpun was first serialized in Shogakukan's Weekly Young Sunday from March 15, 2007, until July 31, 2008, when the magazine ceased its publication. It was then transferred to Weekly Big Comic Spirits, being published from October 20, 2008, to November 2, 2013. Shogakukan compiled the 147 chapters into thirteen volumes between August 3, 2007 and December 27, 2013. Some of these volumes have been sold as limited special editions with extras like: a phone strap, T-shirt, colored pencil set with figures, and lensless glasses.

In July 2015, Viz Media announced at Otakon that they licensed the manga and would be releasing the manga in seven omnibus volumes, with the first published on March 15, 2016. The final omnibus volume was published September 19, 2017. The manga has also been published in France by Kana, in Italy by Panini Comics, in Germany by Tokyopop, in Taiwan by Taiwan Tohan, in Spain by Norma Editorial, in Argentina by Editorial Ivrea, and in Serbia by Laguna Publishing.

Volumes

Reception 
As of January 2019, the manga had 3 million copies in circulation. Goodnight Punpun won the 22nd Spanish Manga Barcelona award for the seinen category in 2016. The series was nominated for the 2017 Eisner Award in the "Best U.S. Edition of International Material—Asia" category, for its first four volumes. The manga received a Jury Recommendation at the 13th Japan Media Arts Festival Awards in 2009.

References

External links 
 
 

2007 manga
Coming-of-age anime and manga
Drama anime and manga
Inio Asano
Seinen manga
Shogakukan manga
Slice of life anime and manga
Viz Media manga